Otter Creek is the longest river entirely contained within the borders of Vermont. The mouth of the river flows into Lake Champlain.

Settled by indigenous peoples at least 10-11,000 years ago, the river was an important economic region for indigenous people before European settlement. The river became an important economic region for settlers, who took advantage of the river for agriculture and industry through the 18th and 19th centuries.

History
Before European settlement, the river valley was settled by native peoples and was called by early settlers as the "Indian road" because of its importance to navigating Abenaki, Algonquin and Iroquois settlements in the region. Archeological evidence suggest both war parties and trading happened between communities on the river.

Otter Creek (or "Kill") was known to the French as "La Rivière aux Loutres", whence the English name. This would correspond today to the City of Vergennes. In 1731, the French began construction of a fort at Crown Point to be known as Fort Frederic. Before commencing, they founded a new settlement called Addison. With increase awareness of the valley's fertile land, the 18th century saw increased settlement by white settlers.

In 1814, a fleet was hastily, but effectively, assembled here by American forces at Vergennes, to participate in the Battle of Plattsburg.

During the 1800s, communities began to harness the rivers' quick waters for industrial purposes creating hydropower facilities in Rutland, Proctor, Brandon, Middlebury, Weybridge, and Vergennes.

During flooding caused by Tropical Storm Irene, Otter Creek flooded in downtown  Rutland causing millions of dollars in damage.

Geography

Otter Creek rises in the Green Mountain National Forest on the western slopes of Mt. Tabor in the town of Peru in Bennington County, and flows southwesterly into the town of Dorset towards East Dorset, thence veering northward into Emerald Lake.  Thence it runs northward passing through the towns of Danby, Wallingford, Clarendon, and Rutland town, the city of Rutland, and the towns of Proctor, Pittsford, and Brandon, all in Rutland County.  On entering Addison County, it generally forms the boundary between various towns.  It next passes through Middlebury, Weybridge and Vergennes and eventually empties into Lake Champlain at Ferrisburgh.

The stretch of water between the mouth at Fort Cassin Point, Lake Champlain (the site of the former Fort Cassin) and Vergennes is passable by boat, and is frequented by motor boats, canoes, and kayaks.  Indeed, Vergennes was a shipyard of some importance in the various wars of the 18th century.  Many nesting platforms have been built along the creek, so one is likely to see both osprey and bald eagles in the area.

Otter Creek has a falls in the town of Middlebury, the site chosen in 1800 to be Vermont's original seat of higher education, Middlebury College. In Addison and Rutland counties, Otter Creek passes through significant wetlands, in particular Cornwall Marsh, Little Otter Creek Marsh and the Brandon Swamp.

Because of its name, the unusual situation of a river emptying into a creek occurs several times along Otter Creek’s length.  For a list of these tributaries, see Lake Champlain.  The source and mouth are separated by  distance—the (approximate) additional  are due to meandering.

Ecology 
According to the Addison County Planning Commission, the creek has one of the "most intact, wide floodplains" in Vermont. The alder swamps, marshes and floodplains on the river absorb significant amounts of flooding from the river, and were never developed.

Water quality near Lake Champlain and the mouth of the Middlebury River are consistently poor, with high E. coli counts. The river is also the second largest source of phosphorus pollution to Lake Champlain.

Gallery

See also
 List of rivers of Vermont
 Otter Creek Brewing

Notes

References

External links

Brandon Swamp (PDF)
 Cornwall Swamp (PDF)
 Emerald Lake State Park 
  Little Otter Creek Wildlife Management Area (PDF)
  Lower Otter Creek Wildlife Management Area (PDF)
 Otter Creek (Historic New England)
 Otter Creek Whitewater
 Otter Creek State Wildlife Management Area

Rivers of Vermont
Tributaries of Lake Champlain
Rivers of Rutland County, Vermont
Rivers of Bennington County, Vermont
Rivers of Addison County, Vermont